Gornozavodsk ((Naihoro) is a rural locality (a selo) in Nevelsky District of Sakhalin Oblast, Russia, located in the southwest of the Sakhalin Island. Population:

History
It was founded in 1905 when the southern part of Sakhalin belonged to Japan. At the end of World War II, the Soviet Army retook the whole of the island of Sakhalin and the Kuril Islands. The settlement was granted town status in 1947. When coal mining was ended in the 1990s, its population dwindled. As a result, Gornozavodsk was demoted to a rural locality in 2004.

References English

External links
Great Soviet Encyclopedia. Entry on Gornozavodsk 

Rural localities in Sakhalin Oblast